Jeremy O'Day (born August 31, 1974 in Buffalo, New York) is the current general manager and vice president of football operations for the Saskatchewan Roughriders and a former Canadian Football League offensive lineman. He grew up in Lockport, New York, playing high school football at Lockport High School. O'Day played in college at Edinboro University in Pennsylvania.

He was a CFL All-Star in 2006, 2007, and 2009 and winner of the 2008 CFL season Tom Pate Memorial Award for community service.

O'Day announced his retirement on February 8, 2011. On November 9, 2011, O'Day was named Assistant General Manager of the Saskatchewan Roughriders. On August 31, 2015, O'Day took over as interim general manager and Vice President of Football Operations duties for the Saskatchewan Roughriders after Brendan Taman was fired.  The team went 3-6 during his interim tenure.

On January 18, 2019, the Saskatchewan Roughriders named O'Day the team's General Manager, replacing Coach Chris Jones, who left for the NFL.

CFL GM record

References

1974 births
Living people
Canadian football offensive linemen
Edinboro Fighting Scots football players
Saskatchewan Roughriders players
Sportspeople from Buffalo, New York
Toronto Argonauts players